Idhaya Vaasal is a 1991 Indian Tamil-language romantic comedy drama film directed by Chandranath. The film stars Ramesh Aravind and Meena. It was released on 17 May 1991.

Plot 

Aravind is a successful businessman. His brother Murali became a drunkard after his wife divorced him. So his father Krishnaswamy felt guilty and gave Aravind total freedom to choose his future wife. Aravind falls in love with Vaani at first sight. He proposes his wish to Vaani's father, but he declines. He has his reason for it: his elder daughter married a rich man, then they were separated. Aravind follows her everywhere despite being beaten and humiliated. Ganesh, an ex-police officer, befriends and helps Aravind. What transpires next forms the rest of the story.

Cast 

Ramesh Aravind as Aravind
Meena as Vaani
R. Sarathkumar as Ganesh
Sabitha Anand as Vaani's sister
Delhi Ganesh
Uday Prakash
Goundamani as Balaraman
Vivek as Joint
Sethu Vinayagam as Krishnaswamy
Achamillai Gopi as Murali
Sangita as Uma
Pandu
Raviraj as G. K. Rathnam
Thideer Kannaiah
Prathiba
Vasuki
Latha
Baby Sangeetha
Vijay Ganesh
Vaishnavi as Indhu in a guest appearance

Soundtrack 
The music was composed by Viji Manuel, with lyrics written by Muthulingam, Pulamaipithan and Mu. Metha.

Reception 
N. Krishnaswamy of The Indian Express gave the film a mixed review citing : "One weakness of the script is that there are stories within stories" and adding : "Debutant music director Viji has one catchy number, while the camerawork by V. Sukumar is uniformly good. Kamlesh Kumar's dialogues sparkle at places".

References

External links 
 

1990s romantic comedy-drama films
1990s Tamil-language films
1991 films
Indian romantic comedy-drama films